Dame Emily Jane Ruth Lawson  was Chief Commercial Officer at NHS England. Lawson was responsible for the rollout of the United Kingdom's COVID-19 vaccine programme.

Early life and education 
Lawson was born in London. She attended North London Collegiate School and Westminster School, where she studied maths, biology and chemistry. Lawson was an undergraduate student in molecular genetics at the Gonville and Caius College, Cambridge, graduating with a first in 1989. She moved to the University of East Anglia as a graduate student, where she studied a transposons in Arabidopsis. She spent part of her doctoral research at the John Innes Centre. She completed an MBA at Saïd Business School in 1998.

Career 
Lawson joined McKinsey & Company as a partner in 1998. At McKinsey, Lawson worked on change management and gender diversity. She moved to Morrisons as a Human Resources Director in 2013. She stepped down from Morrisons in 2015, and joined Kingfisher plc.

In 2017, Lawson joined NHS England as National Director for Transformation and Corporate Operations. She was made Head of the National Health Service COVID-19 vaccine programme in November 2020. She was seconded to the Government of the United Kingdom for part of 2021, but returned to the NHS programme in October 2021. Here she led the COVID-19 vaccine booster programme.

Lawson was appointed Dame Commander of the Order of the British Empire (DBE) in the 2022 New Year Honours for services to the NHS, particularly during COVID-19.

Selected publications

References 

Year of birth missing (living people)
Living people
People educated at North London Collegiate School
People educated at Westminster School, London
Alumni of Gonville and Caius College, Cambridge
Alumni of the University of East Anglia
Alumni of Saïd Business School
Dames Commander of the Order of the British Empire
British scientists
British women scientists
COVID-19 pandemic in the United Kingdom
McKinsey & Company people
Kingfisher plc
National Health Service people